Stigen is a locality situated in Färgelanda Municipality, Västra Götaland County, Sweden. It had 428 inhabitants in 2010.

Sports
The following sports clubs are located in Stigen:

 Stigens IF

References 

Populated places in Västra Götaland County
Populated places in Färgelanda Municipality
Dalsland